Play My Game is the debut solo album by vocalist Tim "Ripper" Owens. Many well known musicians perform on the album. Play My Game was released by Steamhammer/SPV on May 15, 2009 in Germany, May 18, 2009, in Europe and May 19, 2009 in the US and Canada.

The album features such guests as Doug Aldrich (Whitesnake), Billy Sheehan (Mr. Big), Bruce Kulick (ex-KISS), Jeff Loomis (Nevermore), Michael Wilton (Queensrÿche), James LoMenzo (Megadeth), Steve Stevens (Billy Idol) and Vinny Appice (ex-Black Sabbath, ex-Dio).

Track listing

Personnel
Tim "Ripper" Owens - lead vocals, additional guitars

Guitar
Bob Kulick - tracks 1, 4, 6, 8, 9, 13
Bruce Kulick - track 6
Carlos Cavazo - track 5
Craig Goldy - track 2
Doug Aldrich - track 7
Chris Caffery - track 12
Steve Stevens - track 4
Jeff Loomis - track 3
Michael Wilton - track 8
Neil Zaza - track 10
John Comprix - tracks 2, 3, 5, 7, 10, 11
Mike Callahan - track 4

Bass
Marco Mendoza - track 12
Billy Sheehan - tracks 6, 7
David Ellefson - track 8
James Lomenzo - track 3, 11
Rudy Sarzo - tracks 1, 2, 5, 10, 13
Tony Franklin - track 9
Dennis Hayes - track 4

Drums
Simon Wright - tracks 1, 2, 5, 7, 8, 10, 12
Vinny Appice - track 13
Bobby Jarzombek - track 9
Ray Luzier - track 4
Brett Chassen - 3, 6, 11

Touring Personnel
Tim "Ripper" Owens - lead vocals
John Comprix - lead guitar
Chris Caffery - lead guitar
David Ellefson - bass
Simon Wright - drums, percussion

References 

2009 debut albums
SPV/Steamhammer albums